Charles Mosley may refer to:
 Charles Mosley (coach) (1888–1968), American football, basketball, and baseball player and coach
 Charles Mosley (genealogist) (1948–2013), British author and editor of genealogies
Chuck Mosley (1958-2017), American singer-songwriter

See also
Charles Moseley, Indiana politician
Charles Mozley, British artist